The Philomel-class gunvessel was a class of wooden-hulled screw-driven second-class gunvessels built for the Royal Navy between 1859 and 1867, of which 26 were ordered but only 20 completed. They had a mixed history, with some serving for as little as 5 years, and others surviving into the 1880s.  Two of the class were sold and used as Arctic exploration vessels, both eventually being lost in the ice.

Design
The Philomel-class gunvessels were an enlargement of the earlier Algerine-class gunboat of 1856.  The first pair of the class were ordered as "new style steam schooners" on 1 April 1857, another three were ordered on 27 March 1858 and a sixth on 8 April 1859; all were built in the naval dockyards. All six were re-classified as second-class gunvessels on 8 June 1859.

With this new classification, a further twelve of the class were ordered by the Admiralty on 14 June 1859, receiving their names on 24 September the same year.  They were constructed of wood in contract yards and then fitted out at naval dockyards. Another six of the class were ordered on 5 March 1860 for construction in naval dockyards, with a final pair ordered in 1861. Of these final eight, six were subsequently cancelled, and one, Newport was suspended for 4 years.

Propulsion
The Philomel class were fitted with a two-cylinder horizontal single-expansion steam engine and a single screw (Ranger had a single-trunk engine).

Sailing rig
The class were fitted with a barque-rigged sail plan.

Armament
Ships of the class were armed with a 68-pounder 95 cwt muzzle-loading smooth-bore gun, two 24-pounder howitzers and two 20-pounder breech-loading guns.  All ships of the class later had the 68-pounder replaced by a 7-inch/110-pounder breech-loading gun.

Ships

References

External links

 
Gunboat classes
 Philomel